Costarica is a genus of grasshoppers in the subfamily Romaleinae; described by Koçak & Kemal in 2008. Its only species is Costarica costaricensis.

References

Caelifera genera
Romaleidae